Sueña conmigo, Donaji is a Mexican telenovela produced by Televisa for Telesistema Mexicano in 1967.

Cast 
Socorro Avelar as Donaji
Héctor Andremar
Yolanda Ciani
Carlos Fernández

References

External links 

Mexican telenovelas
1967 telenovelas
Televisa telenovelas
Spanish-language telenovelas
1967 Mexican television series debuts
1967 Mexican television series endings